Mikael Ishak (born 31 March 1993) is a Swedish professional footballer who plays as a striker for Ekstraklasa club Lech Poznań. Beginning his career with Assyriska FF in 2010, he has gone on to play professionally in Germany, Switzerland, Italy, Denmark, and Poland. A full international since 2015, he has won seven caps and scored one goal for the Sweden national team. He represented the Sweden Olympic team at the 2016 Summer Olympics.

Club career

Early life and career 
Ishak's parents migrated from Syria. He was born in Södertälje, Sweden and started his professional career at Assyriska FF, where he was included in the first team in 2010.

1. FC Köln 
In December 2011, Ishak was signed by German Bundesliga club 1. FC Köln after a successful trial. He made his debut for the side on 21 January 2012 in a 0–1 away defeat at VfL Wolfsburg, where he came on as a substitute in the 85th minute for Martin Lanig. After being used mostly as a substitute during his first month in Köln, Ishak made his first start for the club on 18 March following a suspension for regular striker Lukas Podolski, playing the entire match in a 1–4 away loss at Hannover 96. Ishak would make 11 appearances for 1. FC Köln during his first season.

Loan to FC St. Gallen 
In February 2013, Ishak signed a six-month loan deal with Swiss club FC St. Gallen, who had recently been promoted to the Swiss Super League, in order to play more. He became a regular starter for the club, before suffering a mandibular fracture in a match for the Sweden under-21 team. Ishak made his return in late-April as a substitute in a match against FC Zürich, before becoming a full-time starter again the following week. He made a total of 13 league appearances for St. Gallen, in which he scored three goals.

Parma 
Ishak joined Italian Serie A club Parma on a four-year contract on 5 August 2013.

Loan to Crotone 
He was loaned out to Crotone, competing in the Serie B, following his arrival. He made his debut for Crotone on 24 August 2013 in a match against Siena. On 24 September, he scored his first goal for the side in a 3–1 home win over Modena.

Randers 
In August 2014, a year after joining Parma, Ishak moved to Danish Superliga club Randers FC, signing a three-year contract. He would play for the club for two-and-a-half years, scoring 31 goals in 71 league appearances.

1. FC Nürnberg 
After a highly successful stay at Randers, Ishak joined German 2. Bundesliga club 1. FC Nürnberg in January 2017, six months before his contract expired. He scored Nürnberg's 1000th goal in the 2. Bundesliga on 25 November 2017 in a match against Eintracht Braunschweig. At the end of the 2017–18 season, he reached promotion to the Bundesliga with the club. Ishak scored his first goal in the Bundesliga on 1 September 2018, an important equalizer in the away game against Mainz 05, which ended 1–1.

Lech Poznań 
In July 2020, he was transferred to Lech Poznań on a free transfer. In addition to playing in Polish Ekstraklasa, he also played in the UEFA Europa League games. He was the best Lech's scorer of this competitions; scoring five goals when facing Benfica and Standard Liège.

International career

Youth 
Ishak represented the Sweden U21 team at the 2015 UEFA European Under-21 Championship, and played in four games as Sweden won the entire tournament. He was also a part of the Sweden Olympic team that competed at the 2016 Summer Olympics in Rio, and scored in a group stage game against Colombia before Sweden was knocked after only three games.

Senior 
Ishak made his full international debut for the Sweden national team on 15 January 2015 in a friendly 2–0 win against the Ivory Coast, coming on as a substitute for Isaac Kiese Thelin in the 82nd minute. He scored his first international goal for Sweden on 6 January 2016 in a 1–1 tie with Estonia. Ishak made his competitive international debut for Sweden on 24 September 2022 in a 2022–23 UEFA Nations League B game against Serbia, coming on as a substitute for Dejan Kulusevski in the 85th minute of a 1–4 loss.

Career statistics

Club

International

Scores and results list Sweden's goal tally first, score column indicates score after each Ishak goal.

Honours
Lech Poznań
 Ekstraklasa: 2021–22

Sweden U21
UEFA European Under-21 Championship: 2015

Individual
Ekstraklasa Player of the Month: May 2022
Ekstraklasa Forward of the Season: 2021–22

References

External links
 
 
 
 

1993 births
Living people
Sportspeople from Stockholm County
People from Södertälje
Swedish people of Assyrian/Syriac descent
Association football forwards
Swedish footballers
Assyrian footballers
Sweden youth international footballers
Sweden under-21 international footballers
Sweden international footballers
Swedish expatriate footballers
Swedish people of Syrian descent
Superettan players
Bundesliga players
2. Bundesliga players
Regionalliga players
Swiss Super League players
Serie B players
Danish Superliga players
Ekstraklasa players
Assyriska FF players
1. FC Köln players
1. FC Köln II players
FC St. Gallen players
Parma Calcio 1913 players
F.C. Crotone players
Randers FC players
1. FC Nürnberg players
Lech Poznań players
Expatriate footballers in Germany
Expatriate footballers in Switzerland
Expatriate footballers in Italy
Expatriate men's footballers in Denmark
Expatriate footballers in Poland
Swedish expatriate sportspeople in Germany
Swedish expatriate sportspeople in Switzerland
Swedish expatriate sportspeople in Italy
Swedish expatriate sportspeople in Denmark
Swedish expatriate sportspeople in Poland
Footballers at the 2016 Summer Olympics
Olympic footballers of Sweden